Onze Lieve Vrouwe Gasthuis (English: "Our Lady Hospital") is a major clinical hospital situated near Oosterpark in Amsterdam in the Netherlands. Founded in 1898, it is now part of OLVG, a network of hospitals formed by the merger of the Onze Lieve Vrouwe Gasthuis with the former Sint Lucas Andreas hospital, and is now known as OLVG, West Location.

References

External links 

 

Hospitals in the Netherlands
1898 establishments in the Netherlands
19th-century architecture in the Netherlands